Lophocateridae is a family of beetles in the superfamily Cleroidea, formerly included in the Trogossitidae. Members of the group have a variety of ecologies, including as predators on other insects, as fungivores, or are phytophagous.

Genera
 Afrocyrona Kolibáč
 Ancyrona Reitter, 1876
 Antillipeltis Lawrence, Leschen & Slipinski, 2014
 Colydiopeltis Slipinski
 Eronyxa Reitter, 1876
 Grynocharina Reitter
 Grynocharis Thomson, 1859
 Grynoma Sharp
 Indopeltis Crowson, 1966
 Leptonyxa Reitter
 Lophocateres Olliff, 1883
 Lycoptis Casey, 1890
 Neaspis Pascoe
 Parapeltis Slipinski
 Peltonyxa Reitter
 Promanus Sharp, 1877
 Trichocateres Kolibác, 2010
 †Sinosoronia Zhang 1992 Laiyang Formation, China, Early Cretaceous (Aptian)
†Mesolophocateres Yu, Leschen & Ślipiński 2021 Burmese amber, Myanmar, Late Cretaceous (Cenomanian)
†Parayixianteres Yu, Leschen & Ślipiński 2021 Burmese amber, Myanmar, Cenomanian

References

Cleroidea
Polyphaga families